When You're Strange is a 2009 music documentary film about the American rock band the Doors. It was written and directed by Tom DiCillo and narrated by Johnny Depp. The film begins with the band's formation in 1965, its development over the next two years, the release of their debut album and subsequent albums, Jim Morrison's extensive use of alcohol and drugs which subsequently led to his death in Paris in July 1971. The film features archival footage of rehearsals, TV broadcasts and concert performances, private cine-film and the background to Morrison's arrest at a 1969 Miami concert and later trial. It also includes the first public release of material from Morrison's 1969 short film HWY: An American Pastoral.

Doors' keyboardist Ray Manzarek who was not pleased with the 1991 biopic film, stated that "This will be the true story of the Doors," and that the film will be "the anti-Oliver Stone."

Cast 
Jim Morrison as himself (archive footage) – vocalist of The Doors
Ray Manzarek as himself (archive footage) – keyboardist of The Doors
John Densmore as himself (archive footage) – percussionist of The Doors
Robby Krieger as himself (archive footage) – guitarist of The Doors
Paul A. Rothchild as himself (archive footage) – producer (first five albums)
Bruce Botnick as himself (archive footage) – sound engineer (on all studio albums) and co-producer for L.A. Woman
Johnny Depp – narrator

Production
When the film entered production, the surviving members of the band decided not to be too involved in the project to try to obtain the right neutral balance that an outsider would try to achieve.

Release
The documentary was first screened at the Sundance Film Festival on January 17, 2009. It received somewhat favorable reviews from that showing, but the narration (by director DiCillo) was singled out by most viewers as very seriously flawed for its monotonous delivery. Due to the rash of complaints about the narration, Johnny Depp was hired to redub it. A few months later, DiCillo pronounced the film "just about locked" and announced that there would be a showing of the new "redux" version. It debuted at the Los Angeles Film Festival on Sunday, June 21, 2009.

The completed film was also screened at the London Film Festival on October 16–18, 2009. The film was released in theaters on April 9, 2010, with a soundtrack release on April 6, 2010. It was released in Canada on April 15, 2010. PBS broadcast this film as part of its series American Masters on May 12, 2010. The film was released on DVD on June 29, 2010.

Soundtrack
A film soundtrack entitled When You're Strange: Music from the Motion Picture featuring 14 Doors' songs and Morrison's poetry read by Johnny Depp was released to coincide with the film's release.

Reception
On Rotten Tomatoes, When You're Strange holds a 60% approval rating with an average rating of 5.7/10 based on 70 critic reviews. The consensus notes: "It's far from a critical assessment of the band's music or its legacy, but When You're Strange gives fans a beautifully filmed, lovingly assembled tribute to the Doors." In France, distributed by MK2, the film was released under its original title and received an excellent reception.

Doors guitarist Robby Krieger felt "really happy" about how the film has turned out, crediting in particular the editing work. Krieger believes that the film puts together a more accurate portrayal of Morrison than the 1991 biopic: "I think when you see the Oliver Stone movie – I'm amazed how good Val Kilmer did – but, you know, the problem with that movie is that the script was kind of stupid. It doesn't really capture how Jim was at all. This gives you a much better insight into how his mind worked, I think."

Accolades
The film was nominated for an Emmy Award for Outstanding Nonfiction Series following its airing on American Masters on PBS. 

In December 2010, the film was nominated for a Grammy Award for Best Long Form Video and subsequently won the award in February 2011.

References

External links
 
 
 
 
 

2009 films
The Doors
Rockumentaries
2009 documentary films
American documentary films
Grammy Award for Best Long Form Music Video
Films directed by Tom DiCillo
2000s English-language films
2000s American films